Tetraphenyl butadiene (1,1,4,4-tetraphenyl-1,3-butadiene or TPB) is an organic chemical compound used as an electroluminescent dye. It glows blue with an emission spectrum peak wavelength at 430 nm, which makes it useful as a wavelength shifter.

References

Fluorescent dyes